American Samoa competed at the 2022 Winter Olympics in Beijing, China, from 4 to 20 February 2022.
The last time it competed at the Winter Olympics was in 1994, which also marked its debut.

Nathan Crumpton, who had also competed in the delayed Tokyo 2020 Olympics the year before, was the country's flagbearer during the opening ceremony. This meant he had acted as flagbearer at two consecutive ceremonies spanning the Summer and Winter Olympics, having also carried the American Samoan flag at the 2020 closing ceremony. Crumpton was also the flagbearer during the closing ceremony.

Competitors
The following is the list of number of competitors who participated at the Games per sport/discipline.

Skeleton 

Based on his placement in the IBSF ranking list Nathan Crumpton qualified to compete for American Samoa.

See also
Tropical nations at the Winter Olympics

References

Nations at the 2022 Winter Olympics
2022
2022 in American Samoan sports